This is a list of the oldest cats in the world, listed by reported age, all of whom have attained the minimum age of 25 years. Aging in cats depends on breed, size and diet.

Some of the ages reported here are approximate. Others are based on estimates or hearsay. Few of them have been confirmed by any authoritative agency. Creme Puff (1967-2005) of Austin, Texas is the oldest verified cat ever, while Flossie (born 29 December 1995) is the oldest living cat as of 2022.

Oldest cats by reported age

See also
 List of individual cats
 List of longest living dogs
 List of longest-living organisms

References

External links 
Oldest Cats at Messybeast.com

Oldest cats
cats, oldest
Cats
Oldest animals